was a Japanese visual kei folk rock band. They were originally signed to the now defunct Key Party Records under the name "Crow". The group changed its name when they signed to PS Company in 2000.

History 
The band's major debut was in 2004 with the single "Urei". Kagrra,'s concept is "Neo Japanesque". Their lyrics were in the style of Heian era poetry, their costumes frequently incorporated traditional Japanese clothing styles, and traditional Japanese instruments and drum rhythms were used in some of their songs. On November 10, 2010, it was announced that Kagrra, would be disbanding after ten years together. As a final request, the members asked that fans refer to it as a "demise" rather than a disbandment. The band released one last CD and held a final tour. The CD, entitled Hyakki Kenran, was released on February 2, 2011. Their final tour began on February 13, 2011 and ended on March 3, 2011 at the Shibuya C.C. Lemon Hall in Tokyo.

On July 25, 2011, it was announced that vocalist Isshi died in his home on July 18, 2011. He was 32 years old.

Members
 Isshi (一志) – vocals, flute
 Akiya (楓弥) – guitar
 Shin (真) – guitar, koto
 Nao (女雅) – bass
 Izumi (白水) – drums

Discography

Demo tapes

Albums and EPs

Singles

* #21 Oricon Weekly Charts, December 4, 2006

Videography

References

External links
 Columbia Music Entertainment page
 King Records page
 CLJ Records page
 Official MySpace

Visual kei musical groups
Japanese rock music groups
Musical groups established in 1998
Musical groups disestablished in 2011
Musical groups from Tokyo